The Northern Potter School District is a rural public school district located in northeastern Potter County, Pennsylvania. It serves the municipalities of Ulysses, Ulysses Township, Genesee Township, Bingham Township, and Harrison Township. Portions of Allegany Township and Hector Township are also within its boundaries. According to 2010 federal census data, it serves a resident population of 4,113, making it a district of the fourth class. The educational attainment levels for the School District population (25 years old and over) were 84% high school graduates and 8.2% college graduates. The District is one of the 500 public school districts of Pennsylvania.

According to the Pennsylvania Budget and Policy Center, 51.3% of the District's pupils lived at 185% or below the Federal Poverty level as shown by their eligibility for the federal free or reduced price school meal programs in 2012. In 2009, the Northern Potter School District residents’ per capita income was $14,003, while the median family income was $35,333. In Potter County, the median household income was $39,139. In the Commonwealth, the median family income was $49,501 and the United States median family income was $49,445, in 2010. By 2013, the median household income in the United States rose to $52,100.

Northern Potter School District operates two schools: Northern Potter Children's School (preschool-6th grade) and Northern Potter Junior Senior High School (7th-12th). High school students may choose to attend a half-day vocational training program at Seneca Highlands Area Career and Technical Center, which is located in Port Allegany, McKean County, Pennsylvania. The Seneca HIghlands Intermediate Unit IU9 provides the District with a wide variety of services like specialized education for disabled students and hearing, speech and visual disability services and professional development for staff and faculty.

Extracurriculars
The Northern Potter School District offers a variety of clubs, activities and an extensive sports program.

Sports
Northern Potter School District is in PIAA District 9. The District funds:

Boys
Baseball - A
Basketball- A
Cross Country - A
Soccer - A
Track and Field - AA

Girls
Basketball - A
Cross Country - A
Softball - A
Track and Field - AA
Volleyball - A

Junior High School Sports

Boys
Basketball
Cross Country
Soccer
Track and Field

Girls
Basketball
Cross Country
Track and Field
Volleyball

According to PIAA directory July 2015

References

External links
 Seneca Highlands Intermediate Unit 9
 Pennsylvania Interscholastic Athletic Association

School districts in Potter County, Pennsylvania